Farm, Field and Fireside was a monthly and later weekly newspaper published in 1900 century which offered advice through articles about farming and homemaking. It was published by Charles Henry Howard of the Howard Company in Chicago, Illinois. Its slogan was: "A weekly illustrated family magazine for everyone who tills the soil".

References

External links 
 Illinois Digital Newspaper Collections: Farm, Field and Fireside (1884-1906)
University of Illinois LibGuide: Farm, Field and Fireside
Farm, Field and Fireside Agricultural Newspaper Collection

Newspapers published in Illinois